The Bahrain women's national football team was first formed in 2003. The team represents Bahrain in international women's football and thus falls under the governance of the Bahrain Football Association; more specifically run by the women's committee at the Association. Although participating in several friendly tournaments, the team played its first official international match against the Maldives on April 22, 2007 and entered the FIFA Women's World Rankings in June 2007 at 111th out of 142.

History
The Bahrain Women's National Team is the first National Women's Football Team to be formed in the GCC region. This was a big step for the island nation and it is just a part of Bahrain's dedication towards promoting women's sports. In 2004, Bahrain participated in a Futsal tournament in Amman, Jordan and the next year participated in the West Asian Football Federation Women's Championship 2005 held also in the Jordanian capital, though none of the matches were FIFA officiated. The team placed 4th in this tournament. In February 2006, Bahrain participated in the first ever Arabian Women's Tournament held in Abu Dhabi, United Arab Emirates. The team was better prepared this time and brought home the 1st-place trophy as well as the Fair Play trophy. After this achievement, the sport became even more popular in the country and more girls have expressed their interest to join clubs.  In an effort to improve the national team further, the committee put in a request to FIFA for a licensed female coach to lead the team. As a result, German coach Monika Staab was sent to Bahrain January 21, 2007 for a six-month development program. Under the guidance of Staab, the team played its first official FIFA approved match on April 22, 2007 against the national team of Maldives in Malé, Maldives. During this match, Bahrain put up a great match and managed to secure a historic 7–0 win.

Results and fixtures

2023

Coaching staff

Current coaching staff

Manager history
 Monika Staab (2007)
 Adel Al-Marzooqi 
 Maher Hantash 
 Ghazi Al-Majed 
 Adnan Ebrahim 
 Masoud Al-Ameeri 
 Khalid Al Harban (????–)

Players

Current squad
The following players were called up for the 2022 AFC Women's Asian Cup qualification on 24 October  2021.

Caps and goals correct as of 24 October  2021, after the match against .

Records

Most capped players
(official matches)
Reem Alhashmi

Partners
Solo Sport
Teird Sport
Diyar Al Muharraq
HSBC Bank Middle East
Mashreq Bank Bahrain
Kuwait Finance House
National Bank of Bahrain
Bank of Bahrain and Kuwait
Bank Muscat
Khaleeji Commercial Bank
GFH Financial Group
Citi Islamic Investment Bank
Bank Al-Khair
Bank of Khartoum
Bahrain Islamic Bank
Al Salam Bank
Al Baraka Banking Group
Al Baraka Islamic Bank
ABC Islamic Bank
Kuwait Turkish Participation Bank Inc.
Liquidity Management Centre
RA Bahrain
Arcapita Group
Venture Capital Bank
Viva Bahrain
Stc Bahrain
Zain Bahrain
Batelco
Bahrain Radio and Television Corporation
Television in Bahrain
Bahrain Sports TV
Cryo Temp Bahrain
Cryo Temp Recovery Bahrain
Visit Bahrain
Gulf Air
Bahrain Air
DHL International Aviation ME
Comlux Middle East
Texel Air
Gulf Aviation
Gulf Traveller
Swiftair Bahrain
Bahrain International Airport
Muharraq Airfield
Sakhir Air Base
Isa Air Base
Furata Water Bahrain

Top goalscorers
Reem Alhashmi

Competitive record

FIFA Women's World Cup

*Draws include knockout matches decided on penalty kicks.

AFC Women's Asian Cup

*Draws include knockout matches decided on penalty kicks.

Asian Games

WAFF Women's Championship

*Draws include knockout matches decided on penalty kicks.

Arabia Cup

See also

Sport in Bahrain
Football in Bahrain
Women's football in Bahrain
Bahrain women's national under-20 football team
Bahrain women's national under-17 football team
Bahrain men's national football team

References

External links
Official website
FIFA profile

َArabic women's national association football teams
 
Bahrain